Battle of the Strait of Otranto can refer to:

 Battle of the Strait of Otranto (1917), during World War I
 Battle of the Strait of Otranto (1940), during World War II